The Leibniz Institute for Baltic Sea Research (abbreviated IOW) is a research institution located in Warnemünde (Rostock), Germany.

It is part of the Leibniz-Association, cooperates with the University of Rostock and was founded in 1992. Employing about 160 people the main focus lies on interdisciplinary study of coastal oceans and marginal seas, especially on Baltic Sea related oceanography. The institute is a follow-up of the former Institute of Oceanography ("Institut für Meereskunde") which was part of the GDR Academy of Science.

The institute is divided in four departments: physical oceanography, marine chemistry, biological oceanography, and marine geology. Central task of the institute is fundamental research but also teaching at the universities of Rostock and Greifswald. IOW has direct access to the research vessel Maria S. Merian and can access by request a variety of other medium-sized vessels for longer trips and interdisciplinary tasks from the German research fleet. The institute's facilities are financed by the German Federal Ministry of Education and Research, and the Ministry of Education of Mecklenburg-Western Pomerania.

References
 Homepage

Baltic Sea Research
Oceanographic organizations
University of Rostock